Neocollyris brevipronotalis is a species of ground beetle in the genus Neocollyris in the family Carabidae. It was described by Horn in 1929.

References

Brevipronotalis, Neocollyris
Beetles described in 1929
Taxa named by Walther Horn